Thomas William Hurst (23 September 1987) is an English footballer who is currently unattached.

Career
Hurst was born on 23 September 1987 in Leicester, Leicestershire and started his career with Boston United and played for one game for them in the Football League, a 4–2 defeat to Rushden & Diamonds on 16 April 2005. He could only feature for the youth team during the 2005–06 season, and made 20 appearances.

References

1987 births
Living people
Footballers from Leicester
English footballers
Association football defenders
Boston United F.C. players
English Football League players